Mintzkov is a Belgian rock band from Lier, formally known as Mintzkov Luna. They won first place in Humo's Rock Rally in 2000.

Discography

Albums
 M for Means and L for Love (2003) (as Mintzkov Luna)
 360° (2007)
 Rising Sun, Setting Sun (2010)
 Sky Hits Ground (2013)
 Oh Paradise (2020)

Singles
 "Copper" (2001)
 "Mimosa" (2003)
 "United Something" (2003)
 "I Do" (2003)
 "One Equals a Lot" (2007)
 "Ruby Red" (2007)
 "Return & Smile" (2007)
 "Violetta" (2008)
 "Opening Fire" (2010) (#29 in Ultratop Belgian national charts)
 "Author of the Play" (2010)
 "Finders Keepers" (2010)
 "Automat" (2011)
 "Slow Motion, Full Ahead" (2013)
 "Word of Mouth" (2013)
 "August Eyes" (2020)

Compilations
 "10 Years Mintzkov Rare Recordings 2001-2011" (2011)

References

Belgian rock music groups